The New Zealand national cricket team toured Pakistan in October to November 1969 and played a three-match Test series against the Pakistan national cricket team. New Zealand won the Test series 1–0. New Zealand were captained by Graham Dowling and Pakistan by Intikhab Alam.

New Zealand had just finished three Test campaigns in England and India.

This was the first ever series win by New Zealand after almost 40 years and 30 consecutive winless series.

Test series summary

First Test

Second Test

Third Test

References

External links

1969 in New Zealand cricket
1969 in Pakistani cricket
1969
International cricket competitions from 1960–61 to 1970
Pakistani cricket seasons from 1947–48 to 1969–70